István Gergely (born 20 August 1976 in Dunajská Streda, Czechoslovakia) is a Slovak–Hungarian water polo player. He was a member of the gold medal-winning Hungary national team at the 2004 and 2008 Olympics. He also represented Slovakia national team at the 2000 Olympics.

Honours

National
 Olympic Games:
  gold medal – 2004, 2008
 World Championships:
  gold medal – 2003
  silver medal – 2005
 FINA World League:
  gold medal – 2003, 2004
  silver medal – 2005

Club
 Euroleague champion: 2004 (Budapesti Honvéd SE)
 LEN Super Cup winner: 2004 (Budapesti Honvéd SE)

 Hungarian championship (OB I): 2003, 2004, 2005, 2006 (Budapesti Honvéd SE)
 Hungarian Cup (Magyar Kupa): 2006, 2010 (Budapesti Honvéd SE)

Awards
 Member of the Hungarian team of the year: 2003, 2004, 2008

Orders
  Officer's Cross of the Order of Merit of the Republic of Hungary (2004)
   Commander's Cross of the Order of Merit of the Republic of Hungary (2008)

See also
 Hungary men's Olympic water polo team records and statistics
 List of Olympic champions in men's water polo
 List of Olympic medalists in water polo (men)
 List of men's Olympic water polo tournament goalkeepers
 List of world champions in men's water polo
 List of World Aquatics Championships medalists in water polo

References

External links
 

1976 births
Living people
Sportspeople from Dunajská Streda
Hungarians in Slovakia
Slovak male water polo players
Hungarian male water polo players
Water polo goalkeepers
Water polo players at the 2000 Summer Olympics
Water polo players at the 2004 Summer Olympics
Water polo players at the 2008 Summer Olympics
Medalists at the 2004 Summer Olympics
Medalists at the 2008 Summer Olympics
Olympic water polo players of Slovakia
Olympic gold medalists for Hungary in water polo
World Aquatics Championships medalists in water polo
Hungarian water polo coaches